Kosmos 152 ( meaning Cosmos 152), also known as DS-P1-Yu No.7 was a Soviet satellite which was used as a radar calibration target for tests of anti-ballistic missiles.

Kosmos 152 was launched using a Kosmos-2I 63SM carrier rocket, which flew from Site 133/3 at Plesetsk Cosmodrome. The launch occurred at 06:57 GMT on 25 March 1967.

It decayed from orbit on 5 August 1967. Kosmos 152 was the seventh of seventy nine DS-P1-Yu satellites to be launched, and the sixth of seventy two to successfully reach orbit.

See also

 1967 in spaceflight

References

Spacecraft launched in 1967
Kosmos 0152
1967 in the Soviet Union
Dnepropetrovsk Sputnik program